Acetylcholine receptor subunit epsilon is a protein that in humans is encoded by the CHRNE gene.

Acetylcholine receptors at mature mammalian neuromuscular junctions are pentameric protein complexes composed of four subunits in the ratio of two alpha subunits to one beta, one epsilon, and one delta subunit. The acetylcholine receptor changes subunit composition shortly after birth when the epsilon subunit replaces the gamma subunit seen in embryonic receptors. Mutations in the epsilon subunit are associated with congenital myasthenic syndrome.

Role in health and disease
Congenital myasthenic syndrome (CMS) is associated with genetic defects that affect proteins of the neuromuscular junction. Postsynaptic defects are the most frequent cause of CMS and often result in abnormalities in the acetylcholine receptor (AChR). The majority of mutations causing CMS are found in the AChR subunits genes.
 
Out of all mutations associated with CMS, more than half are mutations in one of the four genes encoding the adult AChR subunits. Mutations of the AChR often result in endplate deficiency. The most common AChR gene mutation that underlies CMS is the mutation of the CHRNE gene. The CHRNE gene codes for the epsilon subunit of the AChR. Most mutations are autosomal recessive loss-of-function mutations and as a result there is endplate AChR deficiency. CHRNE is associated with changing the kinetic properties of the AChR. One type of mutation of the epsilon subunit of the AChR introduces an arginine (Arg) into the binding site at the α/ε subunit interface of the receptor. The addition of a cationic Arg into the anionic environment of the AChR binding site greatly reduces the kinetic properties of the receptor. The result of the newly introduced ARG is a 30-fold reduction of agonist affinity, 75-fold reduction of gating efficiency, and an extremely weakened channel opening probability. This type of mutation results in an extremely fatal form of CMS.

See also
 Nicotinic acetylcholine receptor

References

Further reading

External links 
 
 

Ion channels
Nicotinic acetylcholine receptors